Mossige is a village in Time municipality in Rogaland county, Norway. The village is a small farming village composed of about one dozen farms and homes.

References

Villages in Rogaland
Time, Norway